Stop Pretending: What Happened When My Big Sister Went Crazy  (1999) is a novel in verse by Sonya Sones. The free-verse novel follows Cookie, a thirteen-year-old girl, whose older sister is hospitalized on Christmas Eve when she has an intense breakdown that is eventually diagnosed as manic depression. The novel is loosely based on Sones’ own journals from her childhood, when her own sister went through the same treatment.

Stop Pretending was a finalist for the 1999 Los Angeles Times Book Prize for Young Adult.

References

External links

 Author's web site

1999 American novels
Verse novels
American young adult novels
1999 debut novels